RT Documentary (RTД, literally "RTD") is a Russian free-to-air documentary channel presented in both the English and Russian languages. It was launched on 23 June 2011 by the erstwhile President Dmitry Medvedev who visited RT's studio in Moscow, and deals with a wide variety of topics including Russian culture and life in Russia. The channel shows documentaries mostly on Russia but also from around the globe.

History

2022 
On 13 March 2022, RT Documentary YouTube channel with 1.9 million subscribers was suspended.

See also
 RT (TV network)

References

External links

RT (TV network)
Documentary television channels
Television channels in Russia
Television channels in North Macedonia
Television channels and stations established in 2011
Foreign television channels broadcasting in the United Kingdom
English-language television stations